Imad Wakim is a Lebanese politician who serves as member of parliament since 2018. He is a member of the Lebanese Forces and its parliamentary bloc, the Strong Republic. Wakim is a Greek Orthodox Christian.

References 

Living people
Lebanese politicians
Lebanese Forces politicians
Year of birth missing (living people)

Greek Orthodox Christians from Lebanon